Juan Sebastián Muñoz (born 4 January 1993) is a Colombian professional golfer. He played predominantly on the PGA Tour, where he had one tournament victory, the Sanderson Farms Championship in 2019, prior to joining LIV Golf in 2023.

Career 
Muñoz played college golf at the University of North Texas where he won two tournaments his senior year including the Conference USA Championship.

Muñoz turned professional in 2015 and played on the PGA Tour Latinoamérica's Developmental Series where he won two tournaments. His finish on the Series earned him exempt status on the first half of the 2016 PGA Tour Latinoamérica season. However, in February 2016, playing on a sponsor invitation, Muñoz won the Club Colombia Championship on the Web.com Tour. This victory, coming in his hometown of Bogotá, earned him a Web.com Tour card and was the first win by a Colombian golfer on the Web.com Tour. He finished 22nd in the regular season money list, which earned him a PGA Tour card for the 2017 season.

Muñoz's best finish in 2017 was a T-3 in the Greenbrier Classic in July. He fired a "stunning" 61 in the 1st round to take a two shot lead. He followed with rounds of 67 and 68 to maintain the solo lead. He shot a disappointing 72 in the fourth round, however, to lose to Xander Schauffele. This was Muñoz's only top 10 of the year and he failed to maintain his PGA Tour card.

In 2018, Muñoz played well on the Web.com Tour, with two 2nd-place finishes and a 3rd-place finish, to end up 12th on the money list and earn a promotion to the PGA Tour again.

On 22 September 2019, Muñoz won his first PGA Tour tournament, winning the Sanderson Farms Championship in Jackson, Mississippi. Muñoz won in a playoff over Im Sung-jae.

In September 2022, Muñoz was selected for the International team in the 2022 Presidents Cup; he played three matches, winning two and tying the other.

Munoz joined LIV Golf in February 2023 ahead of its second season; as a result, he was suspended from the PGA Tour.

Amateur wins
2010 Copa Joaquin y Tomas Samper Brush, Canadian International Junior Challenge
2012 Abierto de Golf Ciudad de Ibague, Abierto de Golf
2013 Torneo Aficionado Segunda Semana
2014 Abierto de Golf Ciudad de Ibague, Abierto de Golf Bucaramanga, Jim Rivers Intercollegiate
2015 Conference USA Championship

Source:

Professional wins (4)

PGA Tour wins (1)

PGA Tour playoff record (1–0)

Web.com Tour wins (1)

PGA Tour Latinoamérica Developmental Series wins (2)

Results in major championships
Results not in chronological order in 2020.

CUT = missed the half-way cut
"T" = tied
NT = No tournament due to COVID-19 pandemic

Summary

Most consecutive cuts made – 3 (twice, current)
Longest streak of top-10s – 0

Results in The Players Championship

CUT = missed the halfway cut
"T" indicates a tie for a place

Results in World Golf Championships

1Cancelled due to COVID-19 pandemic

NT = No tournament
"T" = Tied
Note that the Championship and Invitational were discontinued from 2022.

Team appearances
Professional
Presidents Cup (representing the International team): 2022

See also
2016 Web.com Tour Finals graduates
2018 Web.com Tour Finals graduates

References

External links

Colombian male golfers
PGA Tour golfers
LIV Golf players
Olympic golfers of Colombia
Golfers at the 2020 Summer Olympics
North Texas Mean Green men's golfers
Korn Ferry Tour graduates
Sportspeople from Bogotá
1993 births
Living people
21st-century Colombian people